Devosia crocina is a Gram-negative, aerobic, non-spore-forming motile bacteria from the genus of Devosia with a single polar flagellum.

References

External links
Type strain of Devosia crocina at BacDive -  the Bacterial Diversity Metadatabase

 

Hyphomicrobiales
Bacteria described in 2009